Louis Gomis (born 15 January 1963 in Dakar, Senegal) is a French boxer who competed in the men's bantamweight event at the 1984 Summer Olympics.

References

External links

Bantamweight boxers
Boxers at the 1984 Summer Olympics
Olympic boxers of France
Living people
Senegalese emigrants to France
Sportspeople from Dakar
1963 births
French male boxers
20th-century French people